Recombination activating gene 1 also known as RAG-1 is a protein that in humans is encoded by the RAG1 gene.

The RAG1 and RAG2 genes are largely conserved in humans. 55.99% and 55.98% of the encoded amino acids contain no reported variants, respectively.

Function 

The protein encoded by this gene is involved in antibody and T-cell receptor V(D)J recombination. RAG-1 is involved in recognition of the DNA substrate, but stable binding and cleavage activity also requires RAG-2. The RAG-1/2 complex recognizes recombination signal sequences (RSSs) that flank the V, D and J regions in the genes that encode the heavy and light chains of antibodies and components of T-cell receptors. The complex binds to the RSSs and nicks the DNA. This leads to the removal of the intervening DNA and the eventual ligation of the V, D and J sequences.  Defects in this gene can cause several different diseases.

Clinical significance 

Because of these effects, Rag1 deletion is used in mouse models of disease to impair T cell and B cell development, and functionally deletes mature T and B cells from the immune system.

In humans, RAG deficiency was first recognised as a form of immune dysregulation known as Omenn syndrome. RAG deficiency is considered an autosomal recessive disease. The disorder is generally identified in infants. Complete loss-of-function in RAG1/2, the main components responsible for V(D)J recombination activity, produces severe immunodeficiency in humans. Hypomorphic RAG variants can retain partial recombination activity and result in a distinct phenotype of combined immunodeficiency with granuloma and/or autoimmunity (CID-G/A), as well as other milder forms, such as antibody deficiency, Idiopathic CD4+ T lymphopenia  or vasculitis. RAG deficiency can be measured by in vitro quantification of recombination activity. 71 RAG1 and 39 RAG2 variants have been functionally assayed to date (2019) (less than 10% of the potential point mutations that may cause disease). However, top candidate variants have been ranked by their predicted clinical relevance.

References